Benjamin Jesse Houston (July 17, 1909 – April 7, 1968) was an American Negro league pitcher who played between 1936 and 1941. 

A native of Montgomery, Alabama, Houston was the brother-in-law of fellow Negro leaguers Virgil Harris and Sonny Harris. He made his Negro leagues debut in 1936 with the Cincinnati Tigers. Houston spent two seasons with Cincinnati, then spent the following two seasons with the Chicago American Giants and finished his career in 1941 with the Homestead Grays. He died in Cincinnati, Ohio in 1968 at age 58.

References

External links
 and Baseball-Reference Black Baseball stats and Seamheads

1909 births
1968 deaths
Chicago American Giants players
Cincinnati Tigers (baseball) players
Homestead Grays players
Baseball pitchers